The Pedernales River is a river that forms the southernmost part of the international boundary between the Dominican Republic and Haiti.

See also
List of rivers of the Dominican Republic
List of rivers of Haiti

References
 The Columbia Gazetteer of North America. 2000.
 GEOnet Names Server
CIA map

Rivers of the Dominican Republic
Rivers of Haiti
Dominican Republic–Haiti border
International rivers of North America
Geography of Hispaniola
Border rivers